

Chennai Times Film Awards 
The Chennai Times Film Awards presented by The Times of India to celebrates the best in the Tamil film industry.

Cinema Express Awards 
The Cinema Express Awards are presented annually by Indian Express Group to honour artistic excellence of professionals in the south Indian film industry which comprises Tamil, Telugu, Kannada and Malayalam film industries.

Dinakaran Cinema Awards 
The Dinakaran Cinema Awards are presented to the best artistes and technicians of Tamil Cinema (of the respective year), on behalf of Dinakaran Tamil daily newspaper. Readers of Dinakaran paper choose these award winners.

Filmfare Awards South 
The Filmfare Awards South is the South Indian segment of the annual Filmfare Awards, presented by The Times Group to honour both artistic and technical excellence of professionals in the South Indian film industry. The awards are separately given for Kannada, Tamil, Telugu and Malayalam films.

Kalaimamani Awards 
The Kalaimamani is an award in Tamil Nadu state, India. These awards are given by the Tamil Nadu Iyal Isai Nataka Manram (literature, music and theatre) for excellence in the field of art and literature.

South Indian International Movie Awards 
The South Indian International Movie Awards are rewards the artistic and technical achievements of the South Indian film industry.

Tamil Nadu State Film Awards 
The Tamil Nadu State Film Awards are the most notable film awards given for Tamil films in India. They are given annually to honour the best talents and provide encouragement and incentive to the South Indian film industry by the Government of Tamil Nadu.

Vijay Awards 
The Vijay Awards are presented by the Tamil television channel STAR Vijay to honour excellence in Tamil cinema.

Zee Cine Awards – Tamil 
The Zee Cine Awards – Tamil is an annual award ceremony organised by the Zee Entertainment Enterprises.

See also 
Ajith Kumar filmography

Notes

References 

Kumar, Ajith